Windygates is a small village and surrounding district in central Fife, Scotland.

The district encompasses the following villages, farms and estates; Wellsgreen Farm, Little Lun Farm, Woodbank Farm, The Maw (a former mining community on the Standing Stane Road), Cameron Farm, Isabella (an abandoned mine), Smithyhill, Cameron Bridge, Bridgend, Durie Estate, Duniface Farm, Haughmill (a former weaving community), Drumcaldie, The Meetings (confluence of rivers Leven and Ore), Bankhead of Balcurvie Farm, Fernhill, Fernbank (both former farms), Balcurvie village (a former weaving community), Little Balcurvie (now known as the small holdings), Hawthorn Bank, Kennowayburns and Windygates village itself.

Housing demands of the 20th century brought all of these, almost forgotten identities, together into a district now commonly known as Windygates.

Windygates is off the A911, west of its sister village Milton of Balgonie, north of Kirkcaldy on the A915 and south of Kennoway on the A916.

The Windygates Hotel at the village cross was originally a coaching inn, and there were toll gates at the cross until the late 19th century, when the village grew to accommodate the nearby Cameron Bridge distillery.

Famous residents
Historian Gordon Donaldson lived his final years in Windygates and died there.

References

Sources
Scottish Places

External links

Villages in Fife
Levenmouth